Hamed Al-Maqati (born 5 July 1993) is a Saudi Arabian professional footballer who plays as a midfielder for Al-Orobah.

Career
Al-Maqati he started his career of Al-Muzahimiyyah in Saudi Third Division and went up with Al-Muzahimiyyah from the Saudi Third Division to the Saudi Second Division in the 2013-14 season . Al-Maqati left Al-Muzahimiyyah and signed with Al-Diriyah on August 8, 2015 . left Al-Diriyah and signed with Al-Hazem on July 27, 2017 . left Al-Hazem and signed with Al-Ain on a six-month loan on February 6, 2019 . He returned to Al-Hazem and left again and signed with Al-Ain  on a one-year loan on August 31, 2019. On 12 October 2020 Al-Maqati joined former club Al-Diriyah. On 1 July 2022, Al-Maqati joined Al-Orobah.

References

External links 
 

1993 births
Living people
Saudi Arabian footballers
Al-Muzahimiyyah Club players
Al-Diriyah Club players
Al-Hazem F.C. players
Al-Ain FC (Saudi Arabia) players
Al-Orobah FC players
Saudi Professional League players
Saudi First Division League players
Saudi Second Division players
Saudi Fourth Division players
Association football forwards